Physis is a biannual peer-reviewed scientific journal covering the history of science from antiquity to the present day. It was established in 1959 by Leo Samuele Olschki. The journal publishes articles in Italian, English, French, German and Spanish. From 1959 till 1985 it was published quarterly (first series); since 1991 (second series) it has been published biannually.

Abstracting and indexing
The journal is abstracted and indexed in:
EBSCO databases
Index Islamicus
International Bibliography of Periodical Literature
L'Année philologique
Modern Language Association Database
Philosopher's Index
Scopus (selected years only)

zbMATH Open

References

External links 

History of science journals
Biannual journals
Multilingual journals
Publications established in 1959